A LAN-free backup  is a backup of server data to a shared, central storage device without sending the data over the local area network (LAN). It is usually achieved by using a storage area network (SAN). 

Note that trivial backup to a dedicated, unshared storage device (such as local tape drive) does not meet the definition.

Technical aspects 
The goal of LAN-free backup is to reduce the load on LAN and reduce the time it takes to complete the backup. It offers an alternative way of backup than a simple data copy to network-attached storage (NAS) over LAN

It comes in different flavours:
 with backup server: in addition to a shared storage device (usually a traditional tape library), there exists a central server arbitrating access to device (for all the other SAN servers). The central server however, does not handle data stream itself.
 without backup server: the storage facility (usually a virtual tape library, or VTL) is smart enough to handle multiple data accesses without intermediate component.

See also 
 Data backup
 Storage area network
 Network-attached storage
 Fiber Channel technology

External links
Description of Lan-Free Client Data Transfer Operation
IBM Tivoli Storage Manager: LAN/WAN Backup; ServerFree Backup; LANFree Backup; and Split-Mirror Backup - What Does It All Mean?

Backup
Storage area networks